Sangai International University (SIU) is a private university in Churachandpur district of Manipur, India. It is the first private university in the state and is affiliated to UGC. It is devoted to excellence in teaching, learning, research and developing leaders in many disciplines who make a difference globally. Sangai International University (SIU) is a Private University established in Manipur State by Act No. 6 of 2015 and is notified under the list of Private Universities maintained by the University Grants Commission (UGC), New Delhi. It is a unique Public Private Partnership (PPP) model between the State of Manipur and Sangai International University,the first of its kind in the country. As per with Sangai International University Act, representatives of the Government of Manipur and University Grant Commission, Ministry of HRD, Government of India form part of the Senior Management of the University

References

Private universities in India
2015 disestablishments in India
Educational institutions established in 2015